The Skytrain is an airside automated people mover system operating at Miami International Airport.  It operates within the airport's Concourse D, which is a major international hub for American Airlines.  The system, which opened in 2010 as part of an expansion of Concourse D, can transport passengers from end to end of the mile long concourse in five minutes.  The Skytrain is one of three separate automated people movers operating at the airport. The others are the MIA Mover, which connects to the Miami Intermodal Center, and the MIA e Train people mover connecting Concourse E's satellite building.

System
The Skytrain's infrastructure, including its track and stations, are located on top of Concourse D.  The system serves four stations, which are located at Gates  D17, D24, D29 and D46.  The system's vehicles, which are used in four-car trains, are Mitsubishi Heavy Industries Crystal Movers (The same model also operates on the MIA Mover).  Two of the four cars carry domestic passengers throughout the concourse, while the other two are used to transport arriving international passengers who have not yet cleared border customs to the Concourse D Immigration and Customs Facility.  This is accomplished by having each station set up with two separate boarding lobbies.

Incidents
On 22 December 2015, the Skytrain derailed and was shut down temporarily. One of the cars impacted the roof of the concourse and the other car was derailed. The incident occurred as the system was undergoing maintenance. For this reason, the train was empty with the exception of one maintenance worker. The cars were subsequently removed and inspected at a hangar. The Skytrain was reopened on 26 December 2015; the cause of the derailment remained under investigation.

See also
List of airport people mover systems

References

External links
Map-Skyride-Terminal D (Miami International Airport)

Transportation in Miami
Airport people mover systems in the United States
Crystal Mover people movers
Railway lines opened in 2010
Miami International Airport
2010 establishments in Florida